The Battle of Batoh, also  Battle of Batih, was a battle in 1652 in which Polish-Lithuanian forces under hetman Marcin Kalinowski were defeated by a united army of Crimean Tatars and  Zaporozhian Cossacks in what is now Ukraine. A day after the battle the Cossacks bought the Polish captives from the Tatars. In the following two days all the prisoners were slain.

The Battle of Batoh destroyed many of the best Polish-Lithuanian units. Although Poland managed to rebuild her army soon after the battle, the loss of the most experienced troops resulted in its temporary weakness in Ukraine. Defeat of the Poles contributed to the wars to come with Russia, which in turn resulted in the "Deluge" of the country by Swedish armies.

Background
After the Treaty of Bila Tserkva  was not ratified by the Polish Sejm the Polish–Lithuanian Commonwealth deployed Crown forces under the command of Field Hetman Marcin Kalinowski in the Bracław Voivodeship

According to the historian Hruschevsky, Hetman Bohdan Khmelnytsky claimed that the Poles had violated the Bila Tserkva peace agreement by razing a couple of Cossack towns and preparing for war. A great Cossack council held at Chyhyryn, which also included Tatar delegates, decided that the failure of the Polish Sejm to ratify the treaty meant that the Cossacks were released from their oaths.

Kalinowski intended to use the Trans-Dnieper Crown army, which in April was ordered by John II Casimir Vasa to gather at Kalinowski's Bratslav camp, "to prevent the Cossack army's merger with the Horde" by blocking the Horde's march "into Moldavia to fight the Hospodar" Basil Lupu. "Khmelnytsky sent his son", Tymofiy Khmelnytsky, "together with the Tatars to Moldavia, to take revenge militarily on that country's ruler for having sworn he would give his daughter in marriage to Khmelnytsky's son and then later refusing."

However, the Crown army had only "crossed the river to Kiev" on 14 June on its way to Kalinowski's corps, the Cossack army was already mobilized and merged with the Horde by the end of May, and Kalinowski met them on his own. "The Polish hetman had chosen a flat plain near the Boh and Sob, one so large that the small Polish army could not maintain control of it...he insisted that there had to be room for the troops that were coming to join him: for the Trans-Dnieper Poles, a detachment of the palatine of Bratslav, Stanislaw Lanckoronski, and others that in the end did not manage to join him." "Khmelnytsky, who had a horde of substantial size at his disposal this time, hurried to attack him before the Polish troops from across the Dnieper and other contingents arrived."

The battle
"When the relatively small Tatar vanguard regiment appeared, the Polish cavalry attacked, beginning a battle that lasted through the first day (1 June). During the battle, "Khmelnytsky's main forces arrived, and during the night they bypassed the Polish camp in such a way that the Poles did not notice."

On the second day, the cavalry skirmishes resumed but soon Kalinowski "saw himself surrounded by Cossack and Tatar forces on all sides." "The Cossacks broke through the endless line-more than a mile long-around the camp and entered into its midst." "When its predicament became clear, the Polish army was swept by panic, insubordination, and mutiny." "Some fifteen hundred of them fled", "some perished and others fell into the hands of the Cossacks and Tatars...Kalinowski himself was killed."

The massacre

After the battle, the Cossacks paid the Tatars for possession of the prisoners, and promptly slaughtered the Polish captives to avenge Chmielnicki's defeat at Berestechko in June 1651. According to Hrushevsky and Pasicznyk, Duda and Sikora, the decision to execute the prisoners was taken by Khmelnytsky himself. Khmelnytsky, commanding the unit of Zaporozhian Cossacks, offered Nuradyn Sultan 50,000 thalers for the right to execute the 8,000 Polish captives in revenge for Berestechko. He also promised him the town of Kamieniec for their transfer under his command. Estimated 3,000 to 8,000 Polish soldiers were massacred.

Aftermath
"The situation that existed after Korsun and Pyliavtsi...now arose once more"  with the Polish forces "shattered...Poland defenseless and panic-stricken". (i.e. in 1648 after the first Polish defeats at the start of the rebellion)

A number of notable Polish nobles fell in the battle or the following massacre of prisoners, including Crown Great Quartermaster Samuel Kalinowski, the son of Hetman Marcin Kalinowski, hetman Kalinowski himself, General of the Artillery Zygmunt Przyjemski, Castelan of Czernihów Jan Odrzywolski, rotmistrz Marcin Czarniecki (brother of Stefan Czarniecki) and magnate Marek Sobieski, brother of later King Jan III Sobieski.

The Battle of Batih destroyed many of the best Polish-Lithuanian units. Although Poland managed to rebuild her army soon after the battle, the loss of the most experienced troops resulted in temporary weakness in Ukraine. Defeat of the Poles contributed to the wars to come with Russia, which in turn resulted in the "Deluge" of the country by Swedish armies.

Notes

References
 
 
 Battle of Batoh 1652, Kismeta.com
 History, Poland.gov.pl
 Summary of Conflicts, Jasinski.co.uk

Batih
1652 in Europe
Batoh